The 2017–18 season was Galatasarays 114th in existence and 60th consecutive season in the Süper Lig. The club was aiming for an unprecedented 21st Turkish title after finishing the Süper Lig in fourth place in the previous season.

In Europe, Galatasaray participated in the UEFA Europa League, as well as competing in the Turkish Cup.

This article shows statistics of the club's players in the season, and also lists all matches that the club played in during the season. The season covered a period from 1 July 2017 to 30 June 2018.

Club

Technical staff

Medical staff

   Gürbey Kahveci

Board of directors

Grounds

Kit
Uniform manufacturer: Nike

Chest sponsor: Nef

Back sponsor: Garenta

Arm sponsor: None

Short sponsor: Fluo

Sponsorship
Companies that Galatasaray had sponsorship deals with during the season included the following.

Season overview

Players

Squad information

Transfers

In

 

Total spending:  €40.25M

Out

Total income:  €34.6M

Expenditure:  €5.65M

Competitions

Overall

Pre-season, mid-season and friendlies

Süper Lig

League table

Results summary

Results by round

Matches

Turkish Cup

Fifth round

Round of 16

Quarter-finals

Semi-finals

UEFA Europa League

Second qualifying round

Statistics

Squad statistics

Clean sheets

Overall

Attendances

 Sold season tickets: 39,000 & 197 suites = 41,167

See also
 2017–18 Süper Lig
 2017–18 Turkish Cup
 2017–18 UEFA Europa League

References

External links
Galatasaray Sports Club Official Website 
Turkish Football Federation - Galatasaray A.Ş. 
uefa.com - Galatasaray AŞ

2017-18
Turkish football clubs 2017–18 season
2017-18
2017 in Istanbul
2018 in Istanbul
Galatasaray Sports Club 2017–18 season